Queensland is the second largest state in Australia. It contains around 500 separate protected areas. In 2020, it was estimated a total of 14.2 million hectares or 8.25% of Queensland's landmass was protected.

List of terrestrial protected areas

Conservation Parks

 Anderson Street
 Archer Point
 Baddow Island
 Baffle Creek
 Bakers Creek
 Baldwin Swamp
 Bare Hill
 Barubbra Island
 Baywulla Creek
 Beachmere
 Beelbi Creek
 Bell Creek
 Bingera 1
 Bingera 2
 Bird Island
 Blackwater
 Bloomfield River
 Bloomsbury
 Boat Mountain 1
 Boat Mountain 2
 Bottle Creek
 Boyne Island
 Broadwater
 Buccan
 Buckleys Hole
 Bullock Creek
 Bullyard
 Bunya Mountains
 Bunyaville
 Burleigh Knoll
 Byron Creek
 Cabbage Tree Point
 Caloundra
 Cape Pallarenda
 Carbrook Wetlands
 Carello Palm Swamp
 Carraba
 Causeway Lake
 Charon Point
 Combo 1
 Combo 2
 Coolmunda
 Cooloothin
 Coombabah Lake
 Cressbrook
 Currimundi Lake
 Currumbin Hill
 Daisy Hill
 Dawson River
 Delicia Road
 Denmark Hill
 Djilgarin
 Duggan
 Dwyers Scrub
 Etty Bay Road
 Eudlo Creek
 Fraser Island
 Five Rocks
 Flagstone Creek
 Fleays
 Fleays Wildlife Park
 Flinders Peak
 Futter Creek
 Garden Island
 Goat Island
 Goat Island (Noosa River)
 Granville
 Great Sandy
 Gurgeena
 Hallorans Hill
 Harry Spring
 Hays Inlet 1
 Hays Inlet 2
 Herberton Range
 Highworth Bend
 Horseshoe Bay Lagoon
 Horseshoe Lagoon
 Indooroopilly Island
 Ipswich Pteropus
 Irongate
 Jack Smith Scrub
 Jalum
 Joseph Banks (Round Hill Head)
 Jumrum Creek
 Kamerunga
 Keatings Lagoon
 Keppel Sands
 Keyser Island
 King Island
 Kirrama
 Knapp Creek
 Kurrimine Beach
 Lake Broadwater
 Lake Murphy
 Lark Quarry
 Limestone Creek
 Long Island Bend
 Malanda Falls
 Maroochy River
 Meingan Creek
 Millstream
 Moggill
 Mon Repos
 Mooloolah (Marie Higgs)
 Morven
 Mount Beau Brummell
 Mount Blarney
 Mount Cooroy
 Mount Dumaresq
 Mount Eerwah
 Mount Hector
 Mount Hopeful
 Mount Kinchant
 Mount Leura
 Mount Perry
 Mount Scoria
 Mount Whitfield
 Mouth of Baffle Creek 1
 Mouth of Baffle Creek 2
 Mouth of Kolan River
 Myora
 Neurum Creek
 Newport
 North Pointer
 O'Regan Creek
 Palm Creek
 Palmview
 Pine Ridge
 Plunkett
 Police Paddock
 Princhester
 Reinke Scrub
 Rosins Lookout
 Round Island
 Roundstone
 Samford Ferny Hills
 Serpentine Creek
 Sheep Island
 Sheep Station Creek
 Shoalwater Bay
 Six Mile Creek
 Skull Knob
 South Stradbroke Island 1
 South Stradbroke Island 2
 Speewah
 Spicers Gap Road
 Springwood
 St Helens Gap
 Tallebudgera Creek
 Tinana Creek
 Tinana Island
 Tingalpa Creek
 Tolderodden
 Tomewin
 Toohey Forest
 Tooloombah Creek
 Toorbul
 Townsville Town Common
 Vandyke Creek
 Vernon
 Wararba Creek
 Warrina
 Weyba Creek
 White Blow
 White Rock
 White Rock (Limited Depth)
 Wilandspey
 Woongoolba
 Zamia Creek

Conservation Reserves

Mount Glorious

Feature Protection Areas

 Big Ironbark
 Booroobin
 Goggrell's Tree
 Jowarra
 Rosehall
 Unnamed (20 different areas)
 Western Creek

National Parks

 Albinia
 Alton
 Alwal
 Annan River
 Apudthama
 Astrebla Downs
 Auburn River
 Baga
 Barnard Island Group
 Barron Gorge
 Basilisk Range
 Batavia
 Beeron
 Bendidee
 Binirr
 Bingera
 Binya
 Blackbraes
 Blackdown Tableland
 Blackwood
 Bladensburg
 Blue Lake
 Boodjamulla
 Bowling Green Bay
 Brampton Islands
 Bribie Island
 Broad Sound Islands
 Brook Islands
 Bromley (Ampulin)
 Bromley (Kungkaychi)
 Bulleringa
 Bunya Mountains
 Burleigh Head
 Burrum Coast
 Byfield
 Camooweal Caves
 Cania Gorge
 Cape Hillsborough
 Cape Melville
 Cape Palmerston
 Cape Upstart
 Capricorn Coast
 Capricornia Cays
 Capricornia Cays (scientific)
 Carnarvon
 Castle Tower
 Cherbourg
 Chesterton Range
 Chillagoe-Mungana Caves
 Claremont Isles
 Clump Mountain
 Coalstoun Lakes
 Conondale
 Conway
 Crater Lakes
 Crows Nest
 Cudmore
 Culgoa Floodplain
 Currawinya
  Curtain Fig National Park
 Curtis Island
 D'Aguilar
 Daintree
 Dalrymple
 Daarrba
 Davies Creek
 Deepwater
 Deer Reserve
 Diamantina
 Dinden
 Dipperu (Scientific)
 Djiru
 Dryander
 Dularcha
 Ella Bay
 Endeavour River
 Epping Forest (Scientific)
 Erringibba
 Esk
 Eubenangee Swamp
 Eudlo Creek
 Eungella
 Eurimbula
 Expedition
 Fairlies Knob
 Family Islands
 Ferntree Creek
 Fitzroy Island
 Flinders Group
 Forest Den
 Fort Lytton
 Forty Mile Scrub
 Frankland Group
 Freshwater
 Gadgarra
 Girraween
 Girramay
 Girringun
 Glass House Mountains
 Gloucester Island
 Goneaway
 Goodedulla
 Goodnight Scrub
 Goold Island
 Great Basalt Wall
 Great Sandy
 Green Island
 Grey Peaks
 Grongah
 Gulngay
 Halifax Bay Wetlands
 Hann Tableland
 Hasties Swamp
 Hell Hole Gorge
 Herberton Range
 Hinchinbrook Island
 Holbourne Island
 Homevale
 Hope Islands
 Howick Group
 Hull River
 Humboldt
 Idalia
 Isla Gorge
 Japoon
 Junee
 Juunju Daarrba Nhirrpan
 Kalkajaka
 Keppel Bay Islands
 Keppel Bay Islands (scientific)
 Kirrama
 Kondalilla
 Koombooloomba
 Kroombit Tops
 Kuranda
 Kurrimine Beach
 Kutini-Payamu
 Lake Bindegolly
 Lama Lama
 Lamington
 Lindeman Islands
 Littabella
 Little Mulgrave
 Littleton
 Lizard Island
 Lochern
 Lockyer
 Macalister Range
 Magnetic Island
 Main Range
 Malaan
 Mapleton
 Mapleton Falls
 Maria Creek
 Mariala
 Marpa
 Mazeppa
 Michaelmas and Upolu Cays
 Millstream Falls
 Minerva Hills
 Mitchell-Alice Rivers
 Mitirinchi Island
 Molle Islands
 Moogerah Peaks
 Mooloolah River
 Moorrinya
 Moresby Range
 Moreton Island
 Mount Aberdeen
 Mount Archer
 Mount Barney
 Mount Bauple (Scientific)
 Mount Binga
 Mount Chinghee
 Mount Colosseum
 Mount Cook
 Mount Coolum
 Mount Etna Caves
 Mount Hypipamee
 Mount Lewis
 Mount Mackay
 Mount Martin
 Mount O'Connell
 Mount Ossa
 Mount Pinbarren
 Mount Spurgeon
 Mount Walsh
 Mount Webb
 Mount Windsor
 Mowbray
 Mudlo
 Munga-Thirri
 Muundhi
 Nairana
 Naree Budjong Djara
 Narkoola
 Narrien Range
 Newry Islands
 Ngalba Bulal
 Nicoll Scrub
 Noosa
 North East Island
 Northumberland Islands
 Nuga Nuga
 Nymph Island
 Orpheus Island
 Oyala Thumotang
 Palmerston Rocks
 Palmgrove (Scientific)
 Paluma Range
 Peak Range
 Pinnacles
 Pioneer Peaks
 Pipeclay
 Piper Islands
 Poona
 Porcupine Gorge
 Possession Island
 Precipice
 Pumicestone
 Ravensbourne
 Reliance Creek
 Repulse Island
 Restoration Island
 Rinyirru
 Rocky Islets
 Round Top Island
 Rundle Range
 Rungulla
 Russell River
 Sandbanks
 Sarabah
 Saunders Islands
 Sir Charles Hardy Group
 Smith Islands
 Snake Range
 South Cumberland Islands
 South Island
 Southern Moreton Bay Islands
 Southwood
 Springbrook
 St Helena Island
 Staaten River
 Starcke
 Sundown
 Swain Reefs
 Tamborine
 Tarong
 Taunton (Scientific)
 The Palms
 Three Islands
 Thrushton
 Topaz Road
 Tregole
 Triunia
 Tuchekoi
 Tully Falls
 Tully Gorge
 Turtle Group
 Two Islands
 Undara Volcanic
 Venman Bushland
 Welford
 West Hill
 White Mountains
 Whitsunday Islands
 Wild Cattle Island
 Wondul Range
 Woocoo
 Woondum
 Wooroonooran
 Wrattens
 Wuthara Island
 Wuthathi
 Yamarrinh Wachangan Islands
 Yungaburra

Resources Reserves

 Abbott Bay
 Amamoor Forest
 Bouldercombe Gorge
 Cooloola (Noosa River)
 Flat Top Range
 Heathlands
 Iron Range (Lockhart River)
 Jardine River
 Kennedy Road Gravel
 Lawn Hill (Arthur Creek)
 Lawn Hill (Creek)
 Lawn Hill (Gorge Mouth)
 Lawn Hill (Gregory River Base)
 Lawn Hill (Gregory)
 Lawn Hill (Lilydale)
 Lawn Hill (Littles Range)
 Lawn Hill (Stockyard Creek)
 Lawn Hill (Widdallion)
 Littleton
 Moonstone Hill
 Morgan Park
 Mount Rosey
 Munburra
 Palmer Goldfield
 Stones Country
 Wrattens

Scientific Areas

 Bald Mountain
 Helidon Hills
 Melaleuca
 Mynea Creek
 Nerang
 Northbrook
 Palgrave
 Saltwater Creek
 Stoney Range
 The Lagoons
 Unnamed (29 different areas)
 Wordoon

List of marine protected areas 

Marine protected areas within the Queensland jurisdiction consist of fish habitat areas declared under the Fisheries Act 1994 and marine parks declared under the Marine Parks Act 2004.

Fish habitat areas
Fish habitat areas are listed in two lists - 'A' and 'B'.

List 'A'

Annan River
Baffle Creek
Beelbi
Bowling Green Bay
Broad Sound
Burrum
Cape Palmerston - Rocky Dam
Cawarral Creek
Cleveland Bay
Colosseum Inlet
Corio Bay
Dallachy Creek
Deception Bay
Edgecumbe Bay
Eight Mile Creek
Elliott River
Escape River
Eurimbula
Fitzroy River
Hay's Inlet
Hinchinbrook
Hull River
Jumpinpin-Broadwater
Kauri Creek
Kinkuna
Kippa-Ring
Maaroom
Margaret Bay "Wuthathi
Maroochy River 
Meunga Creek
Moreton Banks
Morning Inlet - Bynoe River
Murray River
Myora - Amity Banks
Nassau River
Noosa River 
Peel Island
Pine River Bay
Princess Charlotte Bay
Pumicestone Channel
Repulse
Rodds Harbour
Sand Bay
Seventeen Seventy-Round Hill
Silver Plains
Staaten-Gilbert
Starcke River (Ngulun)
Susan River
Temple Bay
Tin Can Inlet
Trinity Inlet
Tully River
West Hill
Wreck Creek

List 'B'

Annan River
Barr Creek
Bassett Basin  
Beelbi
Bohle River
Burdekin
Burrum
Cape Palmerston - Rocky Dam
Cattle-Palm Creek
Colosseum Inlet
Coombabah
Coomera
Currumbin Creek
Deception Bay
Edgecumbe Bay
Fraser Island
Half Moon Creek
Halifax
Kolan River
Margaret Bay "Wuthathi" 
Maroochy River 
Midge
Noosa River 
Pimpama
Pine River Bay
Pumicestone Channel
Rodds Harbour
Seventeen Seventy-Round Hill
Starcke River (Ngulun)
Tallebudgera Creek
Trinity Inlet
West Hill
Yorkeys Creek

Marine parks
The Queensland jurisdiction only included the following three marine parks as of 2016; the Great Barrier Reef Marine Park is located within the Australian government's jurisdiction.
 Great Barrier Reef Coast Marine Park
 Great Sandy Marine Park
 Moreton Bay Marine Park

See also

 Protected areas of Australia

References

External links
Department of National Parks, Recreation, Sport and Racing
Queensland Prison & Penal Historical Association

 

Queensland
Protected areas